The Charles T. Wethington Jr. Building is a 210,300 sq. ft. six-story brick and concrete structure for the University of Kentucky in Lexington, Kentucky, located at the corner of Rose Street and South Limestone. It houses offices for the dean and faculty for the College of Health Sciences, along with numerous classrooms and teaching laboratories. It also is host to the offices of the Chancellor of the Medical Center, research facilities andresearch space for the College of Health Sciences.

The original date of completion was April 2002; however, it did not open until February 2003. It is across from the Gill Heart Institute and is linked by a two-story pedestrian overpass.

The building is named for Charles T. Wethington Jr., tenth president of the university.

See also
 Buildings at the University of Kentucky
 Cityscape of Lexington, Kentucky

References

External links
 Charles T. Wethington Jr. Building at University of Kentucky Campus Guide
 Sanders Brown Center on Aging

Buildings at the University of Kentucky
University and college academic buildings in the United States
University and college laboratories in the United States